The 2000 UEFA Super Cup was a football match played on 25 August 2000 between Real Madrid of Spain and Galatasaray of Turkey. Real Madrid qualified by beating Valencia in the 2000 UEFA Champions League Final, while Galatasaray had made it to the Super Cup after beating Arsenal in the 2000 UEFA Cup Final. Galatasaray won the match 2–1, both goals scored by Mário Jardel, the latter a golden goal.

This was the first Super Cup contested by the winners of the UEFA Cup (now the UEFA Europa League). Until 1999, it was contested by the winners of the UEFA Champions League and the winners of the UEFA Cup Winners' Cup, but the Cup Winners' Cup was discontinued after the 1998–99 season.

Venue
The Stade Louis II in Monaco has been the venue for the UEFA Super Cup since 1998. It was built in 1985, and is also the home of AS Monaco, who play in the French league system.

Teams

Match

Details

See also
1999–2000 UEFA Champions League
1999–2000 UEFA Cup
Galatasaray S.K. in European football
Real Madrid CF in international football competitions

References

External links
2000 UEFA Super Cup at UEFA.com

Super Cup
UEFA
UEFA Super Cup 2000
UEFA Super Cup 2000
UEFA Super Cup
Supercup
Supercup
International club association football competitions hosted by Monaco
August 2000 sports events in Europe